Stafford McDowall (born 24 February 1998) is a Scottish professional rugby union player for Glasgow Warriors. His usual position is at the centre position, though he can also cover at full back.

Rugby Union career

Amateur career

McDowall started his rugby career at Kirkcudbright Academy and Stewartry RFC then Merchiston Castle School. He made a Glasgow Warriors U17 side in August 2014. From there he played for Edinburgh U18 and then switched back to play for Glasgow U20.

McDowall now plays for Ayr. He was Ayr's Young Player of the Season for 2016-17.

He entered the Scottish Rugby Academy in season 2016-17 as a Stage 1 - 2 player.

He graduated to the Stage 3 professional phase of the academy in the 2017-18 season. He was assigned Ayr in the Pro draft for the Scottish Premiership sides from Glasgow Warriors for the season 2017-18

Professional career

McDowall was enrolled in the BT Sport Scottish Rugby Academy as a Stage 3 player. Stage 3 players are aligned to a professional club and given regional support.

He made his debut for Glasgow Warriors in their opening match of the 2017-18 season - against Northampton Saints at Bridgehaugh Park, Stirling on 19 August 2017.

He made his first appearance for season 2018-19 for the Warriors in their 50 -17 demolition of Harlequins at North Inch, Perth on 18 August 2018.

He graduated from the Academy and signed his first professional contract with Glasgow Warriors on 12 December 2018.

International career

He played for Scotland U18s in a home v Scottish Exiles match in February 2016. He has also played for Scotland U18s against Wales U18.

McDowall played for Scotland U19 (Development XV) in 2016 against Georgia U20. He scored 2 tries in the match.

McDowall is now playing for the Scotland U20s.

In January 2019 McDowall was named in Scotland's Six Nations squad.

References

External links

 Scotland U20 player profile
 Ayr RFC player profile

1998 births
Living people
Ayr RFC players
Glasgow Warriors players
Rugby union centres
Rugby union players from Dumfries
Scottish rugby union players
Stewartry RFC players
People educated at Kirkcudbright Academy
People educated at Merchiston Castle School